Eris Annie Paton (9 October 1928 – 23 November 2004) was a New Zealand cricketer who played as an all-rounder, batting right-handed and bowling right-arm medium. She appeared in four Test matches for New Zealand between 1954 and 1961. She played domestic cricket for Otago.

References

External links
 
 

1928 births
2004 deaths
Cricketers from Wellington City
New Zealand women cricketers
New Zealand women Test cricketers
Otago Sparks cricketers